A wetland is an area of land whose soil is saturated with moisture  either permanently or seasonally. For specific wetland types see  bog, marsh and swamp.

Wetlands may refer to:

Wetlands (novel), a German erotic novel by Charlotte Roche
 Wetlands (video game)
 Wetlands Preserve, a defunct New York City music venue
 Wetlands (2011 film), a French Canadian film
 Wetlands (2013 film), a German film
 Wetlands (2017 film), an American film
 Wetland (film), a 2021 Spanish thriller film
 Wetlands, an academic journal published by the Society of Wetland Scientists